In Formation is the first studio album by the Kronos Quartet. It contains compositions by Ken Benshof, Hunt Beyer, Alan Dorsey, John Geist, David Kechley, and others. The album was re-issued on CD on 17 December 1993 (Reference #RR-9CD).

Track listing

Critical reception
In Fanfare magazine, the albums was praised highly: "In imaging, transient accuracy and timbre, one of the finest string quartet discs ever issued."

Personnel
David Harrington – violin
John Sherba – violin
Hank Dutt – viola
Joan Jeanrenaud – cello

References 

1982 debut albums
Kronos Quartet albums